OpenO&M (Open Operations and Maintenance) is an initiative of the following industry standards organisations:
 The International Society of Automation (ISA)
 Machinery Information Management Open System Alliance (MIMOSA)
 Manufacturing Enterprise Solutions Association (MESA) International
 OPC Foundation
 Open Applications Group (OAGi)

The aim of OpenO&M is to provide a harmonized set of standards. From the organizational point of view, OpenO&M is a virtual organization maintained by MIMOSA.

OpenO&M framework
The OpenO&M framework consists of the following standards for the exchange of Operations & Maintenance data and associated context:
 MIMOSA Open System Architecture for Enterprise Application Integration (OSA-EAI)
 MIMOSA Open System Architecture for Condition-Based Maintenance (OSA-CBM) based on ISO 13374
 ANSI/ISA-95 – Enterprise/Control System Interface Standard 
 ISA-99 – Control System Cyber-Security Standard 
 ISA-OMAC – Open Modular Architecture Controls group standardizing packaging machinery interfaces 
 OPC interface specifications and data transport standards

Joint working groups
OpenO&M is composed Joint Working Groups (JWG). These JWG are diverse groups of relevant organizations and subject matter experts.
There are three Joint Working Groups:
 Manufacturing JWG
 Facilities JWG
 Military JWG

The JWG are focused on enabling O&M application interoperability. The goal of the JWG is to offer domain end users a harmonized set of data exchange standards while avoiding duplication of work.

References

External links 
 OpenO&M
 ISA
 MIMOSA
 OPC Foundation

Maintenance
Logistics
Standards